is a railway station  on the Meitetsu Nagoya Main Line located in Minami-ku, Nagoya, Japan.

History
Sakura Station was opened on 19 March 1917 as a station on the Aichi Electric Railway. On 1 April 1935, the Aichi Electric Railway merged with the Nagoya Railroad (the forerunner of present-day Meitetsu). The station has been unattended since 15 September 2004.

Lines
Meitetsu
Meitetsu Nagoya Main Line

Layout
Sakura Station has two opposed side platforms connected by an overpass.

Platforms

Adjacent stations

External links
  Meitetsu Station information

Railway stations in Japan opened in 1917
Stations of Nagoya Railroad
Railway stations in Aichi Prefecture